Springdale is a city in Hamilton County, Ohio, United States. It is a suburb of Cincinnati. The population was 11,007 at the 2020 census.

Geography
Springdale is located at  (39.293037, -84.483003).

Demographics

2010 census
As of the census of 2010, there were 11,223 people, 4,631 households, and 2,771 families living in the city. The racial makeup of the city was 55.0% White, 29.9% African American, 0.3% Native American, 2.8% Asian, 0.4% Pacific Islander, 8.7% from other races, and 2.9% from two or more races. Hispanic or Latino of any race were 17.5% of the population.

There were 4,631 households, of which 29.1% had children under the age of 18 living with them, 40.2% were married couples living together, 14.8% had a female householder with no husband present, 4.9% had a male householder with no wife present, and 40.2% were non-families. 34.9% of all households were made up of individuals, and 19.5% had someone living alone who was 65 years of age or older. The average household size was 2.38 and the average family size was 3.07.

The median age in the city was 38.7 years. 22.6% of residents were under the age of 18; 9.4% were between the ages of 18 and 24; 25.1% were from 25 to 44; 22.9% were from 45 to 64; and 20% were 65 years of age or older. The gender makeup of the city was 46.5% male and 53.5% female.

2000 census
As of the census of 2000, there were 10,563 people, 4,421 households, and 2,816 families living in the city. The population density was 2,131.0 people per square mile (822.3/km). There were 4,607 housing units at an average density of 929.4 per square mile (358.6/km). The racial makeup of the city was 68.38% White, 25.63% African American, 0.11% Native American, 2.53% Asian, 0.02% Pacific Islander, 1.50% from other races, and 1.84% from two or more races. Hispanic or Latino of any race were 3.64% of the population.

There were 4,421 households, out of which 29.0% had children under the age of 18 living with them, 46.7% were married couples living together, 13.7% had a female householder with no husband present, and 36.3% were non-families. 32.0% of all households were made up of individuals, and 16.3% had someone living alone who was 65 years of age or older. The average household size was 2.33 and the average family size was 2.95.

In the city, the population was spread out, with 24.0% under the age of 18, 7.3% from 18 to 24, 27.0% from 25 to 44, 23.0% from 45 to 64, and 18.7% who were 65 years of age or older. The median age was 39 years. For every 100 females, there were 82.9 males. For every 100 females age 18 and over, there were 76.6 males.

The median income for a household in the city was $44,732, and the median income for a family was $53,979. Males had a median income of $43,259 versus $29,763 for females. The per capita income for the city was $23,688. About 7.7% of families and 8.9% of the population were below the poverty line, including 13.2% of those under age 18 and 5.6% of those age 65 or over.

Economy
Kroger operates its Cincinnati-area regional offices at 150 Tri-County Parkway in Springdale; Kroger is headquartered in nearby Cincinnati.

Institutions
 Cincom Systems
 Humana RightSourceRx
 Maple Knoll Village and WMKV
 Tri-County Mall

References

External links
 City website

Cities in Hamilton County, Ohio
Cities in Ohio